The Mount Olive Trojans are the athletic teams that represent the University of Mount Olive, located in Mount Olive, North Carolina, in NCAA Division II intercollegiate sporting competitions. UMO's sports teams are known as the Trojans; their colors are green and white. The Trojans participate as a member of Conference Carolinas at the NCAA Division II level in 18 sports:

Varsity sports

Championships
In 2008, Mount Olive won the NCAA Division II Baseball National Championship. The Trojans posted a 58–6 record that year, winning the Conference Carolinas and NCAA II South Atlantic Regional titles. The Trojans defeated Ouachita Baptist (Ark.) 6–5 in the first round of the National Finals and Ashland (Ohio) 18–7 in the second round. Mount Olive defeated Central Missouri 5–3 in the semifinal round and claimed its first-ever national championship with a 6–2 victory over Ouachita Baptist in the title game. The national championship game was televised live on CBS College Sports. The National Finals took place in Sauget, Illinois.

Mount Olive teams have made 30 NCAA Division II tournament appearances.

Mount Olive teams have won a combined 39 Conference Carolinas regular season and/or tournament championships.

Mount Olive was the recipient of the 2011–12 Joby Hawn Cup, awarded to the top athletics program in Conference Carolinas.  In addition to the overall award, Mount Olive also captured the Men's Sports Hawn Cup and the Women's Sports Hawn Cup.

Team (1)

Individual sports

Lacrosse
Men's and women's lacrosse have been added as the college's newest teams and will begin competing in spring 2013.

Basketball
In 2005, the Trojan men's basketball team won the NCAA II East Regional and advanced to the Elite 8 in Grand Forks, North Dakota.

References